The Montreal Royal is a professional ultimate franchise based in Montreal, Quebec, Canada. They are members of the Eastern Division of the American Ultimate Disc League (AUDL). The team was the second Canadian franchise to join the AUDL, after the Toronto Rush. The Royal play their home games at Claude-Robillard Sports Complex in Montreal, Quebec. They played their inaugural game on April 19, 2014, where they hosted the Toronto Rush and lost by a score of 22-14. In this game, the Royal broke the AUDL attendance record previously held by the Rush with more than 3,000 fans. The team name has several references: a spring Association de Ultimate de Montréal league team called Royal that the co-owners play on, the Montreal hill Mount Royal, and a nod to the former minor league professional baseball team Montreal Royals.

External links
 Official website

References

Ultimate (sport) teams
2013 establishments in Quebec
Ultimate teams established in 2013
Sports teams in Montreal